10 000 Hz Legend is the second studio album by French electronic music duo Air, released in France on 28 May 2001 by Virgin Records and in the United States on 29 May 2001 by Astralwerks. On this album, tracks are longer and more electronic-oriented than on their previous records. These experimentations find the duo expanding their capacities and working with other artists including Beck and suGar Yoshinaga of Buffalo Daughter.

The album artwork was produced by Ito Morabito and its cover image features Monument Valley, located on the Arizona–Utah border.

Critical reception

10 000 Hz Legend received generally less favourable reviews from critics than had their previous albums. Most reviewers focused on the group's departure from the sound of 1998's Moon Safari, although the soundtrack album The Virgin Suicides (2000) had a similar mood and sound. Q listed 10 000 Hz Legend as one of the 50 best albums of 2001.

The American music website Stereogum takes its name from the lyrics of the song "Radio #1".

Track listing

Personnel
Credits adapted from the liner notes of 10 000 Hz Legend.

Musicians

 Air – arrangements
 Brian Reitzell – drums ; drum sounds 
 Justin Meldal-Johnsen – bass ; solo vocals ; drum sound 
 Roger Joseph Manning Jr – keyboards ; vocals 
 Beck Hansen – vocals ; harmonica 
 Jason Falkner – vocals 
 Ken Andrews – vocals 
 Buffalo Daughter – vocals 
 Lisa Papineau – vocals 
 Jean Croc – whistle 
 Elin Carlson – solo soprano 
 Barbara Cohen – voice 
 Corky Hale – harp 
 Julia Sarr – background vocals 
 Olyza – background vocals 
 Thomas – hand claps 
 Annabel – hand claps 
 Jean-Benoît Dunckel – hand claps 
 Roger Neill – string, choir and flute conducting, arrangements

Technical
 Air – recording, production
 Julien Marty – sound engineering
 Julien Doubey – sound engineering
 Pascal Garnon – drum recording
 Brian Kehew – sound engineering
 Bruce Keen – sound engineering, editing
 Tony Hoffer – additional production, editing, mixing
 Julien Delfaud – mixing assistance
 Nilesh Patel – mastering
 Stéphane Elfassi – executive production
 Marc Teissier du Cros – executive production

Artwork
 Abake – Air logo, layout
 Ora-Ïto – concept, design
 Arno Bani – photography

Charts

Weekly charts

Year-end charts

Certifications and sales

References

2001 albums
Air (French band) albums
Albums produced by Tony Hoffer
Albums recorded at Capitol Studios
Astralwerks albums
Virgin Records albums